The Carroll Daily Times Herald is a daily newspaper in Carroll, Iowa.

Coal miner turned journalist James W. Wilson became business manager in 1929 and became owner in 1944.  His grandson Douglas W. Burns is currently co-owner and vice president of news.

Starting in 2017, the Herald began a series of stories about Carroll police officer Jacob Smith and his sexual relationships with teenagers.  Smith resigned and sued the newspaper for libel.  The lawsuit was dismissed on the basis of the truth of the allegations in the news stories, but legal expenses have forced the newspaper to move to a twice-weekly schedule.

References

External links
Official website

Newspapers published in Iowa